The SP-70 is a highway in the southeastern part of the state of São Paulo in Brazil.  A part of the highway from the city of São Paulo to the BR-116 (Rodovia Presidente Dutra) is called the Rodovia Ayrton Senna which is named after Ayrton Senna da Silva (also called Trabalhadores). Another part of the highway from Guararema to Taubaté is called the Rodovia Carvalho Pinto which is named after a former governor of the state, José Alberto Carvalho Pinto .

References

Highways in São Paulo (state)